The Society of Sigma Gamma Epsilon is a national honor society to recognize scholarship in the earth sciences founded in 1915 at the University of Kansas.  It has chartered more than 200 chapters at colleges and universities across the United States.

Purpose and objective 
The Society was established to recognize scholarship and professionalism in the Earth Sciences. It has for its objectives the scholastic, scientific, and professional advancement of its members and the extension of relations of friendship and assistance among colleges and universities which are devoted to the advancement of the Earth Sciences.

History and government 
The Society was founded on March 30, 1915, at The University of Kansas. Nearly 200 chapters throughout the United States have been installed since 1915. Government of the Society is by student members and the ultimate legislative authority is vested in a National Convention held every two years. It is composed of one student delegate from each chapter and the seven national officers who are faculty members.

Sigma Gamma Epsilon is associated with the Geological Society of America.

Chapters

References 

Honor societies
Earth sciences
University of Kansas
1915 establishments in Kansas
Student organizations established in 1915